In mathematics, a Fuchsian model is a representation of a hyperbolic Riemann surface R as a quotient of the upper half-plane H by a Fuchsian group. Every hyperbolic Riemann surface admits such a representation. The concept is named after Lazarus Fuchs.

A more precise definition

By the uniformization theorem, every Riemann surface is either elliptic, parabolic or hyperbolic. More precisely this theorem states that a Riemann surface  which is not isomorphic to either the Riemann sphere (the elliptic case) or a quotient of the complex plane by a discrete subgroup (the parabolic case) must be a quotient of the hyperbolic plane  by a subgroup  acting properly discontinuously and freely. 

Fuchsian models and Teichmüller space 

Let 

and endow this set with the topology of pointwise convergence (sometimes called "algebraic convergence"). Then we give it the subspace topology. 

The Nielsen isomorphism theorem (this is not standard terminology and this result is not directly related to the Dehn–Nielsen theorem) then has the following statement: 

The proof is very simple: choose an homeomorphism  and lift it to the hyperbolic plane. Taking a diffeomorphism yields quasi-conformal map since  is compact. 

This result can be seen as the equivalence between two models for Teichmüller space of : the set of discrete faithful representations of the fundamental group  into  modulo conjugacy and the set of marked Riemann surfaces  where  is a quasiconformal homeomorphism modulo a natural equivalence relation.

See also
 the Kleinian model, an analogous construction for 3-manifolds
 Fundamental polygon

References

Matsuzaki, K.; Taniguchi, M.: Hyperbolic manifolds and Kleinian groups. Oxford (1998).

Hyperbolic geometry
Riemann surfaces